Cambro-Normans ("Wales",) were Normans who settled in southern Wales and the Welsh Marches after the Norman invasion of Wales, allied with their counterpart families who settled England following its conquest.

Usage in Ireland 

Some Irish historians prefer to use this term instead of Anglo-Norman because many of the knights who invaded Ireland in 1170, such as the FitzGeralds, originated and settled in modern-day Wales, following the Norman conquest. South Wales was under Anglo-Norman, Plantagenet control at this point in history and the Cambro-Normans living in south Wales owed their allegiance to the Le Mans born Henry II, not a native Welsh prince, and therefore are often confused with Anglo-Normans due to their allegiance. Contemporary Irish accounts of this period erroneously called the incomers Saxain, which means "Saxon", i.e. "English".

The term Cambro-Norman is rarely used even in Ireland, and the Normans who invaded Ireland are incorrectly described as Anglo-Normans by modern historians or else as English.

Richard de Clare, better known as Strongbow, has been described by some Irish historians as a Cambro-Norman rather than an Anglo-Norman. The de Clares held lands in Pembrokeshire and Glamorgan, but their base was in Chepstow which, although is now a border settlement in Monmouthshire, Wales, was part of the English county of Herefordshire at the time. Strongbow also held lands in Gloucestershire, Hertfordshire and Suffolk. Herefordshire is in the Welsh Marches, of which Strongbow was a Marcher Lord. He is believed to have retreated to his English holdings when the Welsh began to attack his territory in Netherwent. Strongbow was living in England when he was contacted by Diarmaid MacMurrough, the king of Leinster.

In addition to such Cambro-Norman lords, some of Ireland's most common names, including Walsh and Griffith, came from indigenous Welsh families who came with the Norman invasion. (The surname "Walsh" itself, or in Irish , "Briton", means "Welshman", and was applied by the Irish to Welsh who didn't have a surname, as well as to particular Cambro-Norman lords). Other indigenous Welsh surnames, such as Taaffe which came at this time, became very important families within the Pale.

Probably the best known Cambro-Norman surname, also called Hiberno-Norman, is Costello (see also Gilbert de Angulo). Other Cambro-Norman families include the Butlers, the Joyces and the Barretts.

See also
 Italo-Norman
 Anglo-Norman
 Scoto-Norman
 Hiberno-Norman

References

External links
Cambro-Norman invasion of Ireland
Norman and Cambro-Norman surnames of Ireland

 Cambro-Normans
Normans
Ethnic groups in Ireland
Lordship of Ireland